Søren Hald Møller (born 25 January 1960 in Copenhagen) was the High Commissioner of Greenland. He has a master's degree in social science from Aalborg University, which he received in 1984. He is married to Tukummeq Qaavigaq. In 2007 he became a Knight of the Dannebrog.

Career 
 1985 – 1986 Teaching at the gymnasium and HF course in Frederikshavn and Aars
 1986 – 1987 Head of the Public Procurement Board
 1987 – 1992 Head of Section and Head of Department, the Greenland Home Rule Economics Directorate
 1992 – 1995 Director/deputy chief, The Cabinet Secretariat in Greenland Home Rule
 1995 – 1996 CEO of KNI Holding A/S
 1997 – 1999 Director of Greenland Home Rule, the Directorate of Environment and Nature
 1999 – 2002 Managing Director of The Cabinet Secretariat in Greenland Home Rule
 2002 – 2005 Project Manager and Head of Department, the Greenland Home Rule Bureau of Minerals And Petroleum
 2005 – 2011 High Commissioner of Greenland
 2011 - 2013 CEO of Municipality Sermersooq
 2013 - Director, the Greenland Government's Environment Agency for Mineral Resources Activities

References 
 CV at Prime Ministry of Denmark

Politics of Greenland
1960 births
Living people
High Commissioners of Greenland
Politicians from Copenhagen
Aalborg University alumni